James Aubrey Simmons (July 8, 1897 – November 30, 1979) was a Canadian politician, notary and magistrate.

Born in Revelstoke, British Columbia, Simmons would go on to sit many times in the House of Commons of Canada representing the Yukon Territory.

A member of the Liberal Party, his first win came in 1949 when he represented the federal constituency of Yukon-Mackenzie River, an electoral district newly crafted out of the Yukon electoral district in 1947. Simmons easily won the election. His rival, Arthur Massey Berry, an Independent, lost by over 1,000 votes.

By 1953, at the next federal election, the riding of Yukon-Mackenzie River was abolished and transformed again into the Yukon electoral district. Running again for a seat in the House, Simmons won the 1953 election for the Yukon. In parliament, Simmons sponsored a bill for the creation of an Alaska-Yukon pipeline.

He was re-elected in 1957 federal election, but his election was declared void and he lost the subsequent by-election. He tried in the 1958 federal election to regain his seat but was again defeated and he never again went for a seat in the House of Commons.

He died in 1979 following a stroke.

References

External links

1897 births
1979 deaths
People from Revelstoke, British Columbia
Members of the House of Commons of Canada from Yukon
Members of the House of Commons of Canada from the Northwest Territories
Liberal Party of Canada MPs